Behind the Wall  may refer to:
 Behind the Wall (2008 film)
 Destiny (1921 film) or Behind the Wall, a silent film
 Behind the Wall (1971 film), a Polish TV film by Krzysztof Zanussi
 "Behind the Wall", a song by Tracy Chapman from Tracy Chapman